Milostín is a municipality and village in Rakovník District in the Central Bohemian Region of the Czech Republic. It has about 300 inhabitants.

Administrative parts
The village of Povlčín is an administrative part of Milostín.

Notable people
Jiří Pleskot (1922–1997), actor

References

Villages in Rakovník District